DIW may refer to:
 DIW Records, a Japanese record label
 "Doing It Wrong", scuba diving violating "Doing It Right" safety rules
 Deionized water
 Deutsches Institut für Wirtschaftsforschung, the German Institute for Economic Research